Church Warsop  is a village in Nottinghamshire, England. It is located 1 mile north of Warsop and is within the Warsop civil parish.

The parish church of St Peter and St Paul is early Norman.

The village was built in the 1926 by the Staveley Coal and Iron Company to house colliery workers and their families working at their Warsop Main Colliery located in nearby Warsop Vale. There is also a second church, the "Chapel of Bethlem", from the same date as much of the village.

References

External links

Villages in Nottinghamshire
Mansfield District